Lithuania participated in the Eurovision Song Contest 2010 with the song "Eastern European Funk" written and performed by the group InCulto. The Lithuanian broadcaster Lithuanian National Radio and Television (LRT) organised the national final "Eurovizijos" dainų konkurso nacionalinė atranka (Eurovision Song Contest national selection) in order to select the Lithuanian entry for the 2010 contest in Oslo, Norway. The national final took place over four weeks and involved 34 competing entries. The results of each show were determined by the combination of votes from a jury panel and a public vote. In the final, twelve artists and songs remained and "Eastern European Funk" performed by InCulto was selected as the winner.

Lithuania was drawn to compete in the second semi-final of the Eurovision Song Contest which took place on 27 May 2010. Performing as the opening entry for the show in position 1, "Eastern European Funk" was not announced among the top 10 entries of the second semi-final and therefore did not qualify to compete in the final. It was later revealed that Lithuania placed twelfth out of the 17 participating countries in the semi-final with 44 points.

Background 

Prior to the 2010 contest, Lithuania had participated in the Eurovision Song Contest ten times since its first entry in 1994. The nation’s best placing in the contest was sixth, which it achieved in 2006 with the song "We Are the Winners" performed by LT United. Following the introduction of semi-finals in 2004, Lithuania, to this point, has managed to qualify to the final three times. In the 2009 contest, "Love" performed by Sasha Son qualified to the final where the song scored 23 points and placed 23rd.

For the 2010 contest, the Lithuanian national broadcaster, Lithuanian National Radio and Television (LRT), broadcast the event within Lithuania and organised the selection process for the nation's entry. Other than the internal selection of their debut entry in 1994, Lithuania has selected their entry consistently through a national final procedure. On 15 December 2009, LRT announced that they would not participate in the 2010 Eurovision Song Contest due to financial problems. However, the broadcaster confirmed their participation on 6 January 2010 and announced the organization of "Eurovizijos" dainų konkurso nacionalinė atranka, which would be the national final to select Lithuania's entry for Oslo, after receiving funding from the company Teo LT. Nerijus Ivanauskas, deputy director of Teo LT, stated: "It was decided to support LRT for two reasons: the international image of Lithuania and Teo LT digital development".

Before Eurovision

"Eurovizijos" dainų konkurso nacionalinė atranka 
"Eurovizijos" dainų konkurso nacionalinė atranka (Eurovision Song Contest national selection) was the national final format developed by LRT in order to select Lithuania's entry for the Eurovision Song Contest 2010. The competition involved a four-week-long process that commenced on 13 February 2010 and concluded with a winning song and artist on 27 February 2010. The four shows took place at the LRT studios in Vilnius and were hosted by Giedrius Masalskis. The shows were broadcast on LTV, LTV World and Lietuvos Radijas as well as online via the broadcaster's website lrt.lt. The final was also streamed online at the official Eurovision Song Contest website eurovision.tv.

Format 
The 2010 competition involved 34 entries and consisted of four shows. The first three shows were the semi-finals consisting of eleven or twelve entries each. The top three entries proceeded to the final from each semi-final, while LRT also selected three wildcard acts for the final out of the remaining non-qualifying acts from the semi-finals. In the final, the winner was selected from the remaining twelve entries. Monetary prizes were also awarded to the top three artists by the Lithuanian Copyright Protection Association (LATGA). The winner received 15,000 LTL, while the second place received 7,000 LTL and the third place received 3,000 LTL.

The results of each of the four shows were determined by the 50/50 combination of votes from a five-member jury panel and public televoting. The ranking developed by both streams of voting was converted to points from 1-8, 10 and 12 and assigned based on the number of competing songs in the respective show. The public could vote through telephone and SMS voting. Ties in all shows were decided in favour of the entry that received the most votes from the public.

Competing entries 
LRT opened a submission period on 6 January 2010 for artists and songwriters to submit their entries with the deadline on 24 January 2010. On 1 February 2010, LRT announced the 36 entries selected for the competition from 81 submissions received. Among the artists were previous Lithuanian Eurovision contestants 4Fun, which represented Lithuania in 2007, and Sasha Song, who represented Lithuania in 2009. On 27 February 2010, the final changes to the list of 36 competing acts were made with the withdrawal of the songs "Nupirkta pasaka" performed by Donata Virbilaitė and "Faces" performed by Vanilla Soud.

Shows

Semi-finals
The three semi-finals of the competition aired on 13, 20 and 27 February 2010 and featured the 34 competing entries. The members of the jury consisted of Mindaugas Urbaitis (member of LATGA; all semi-finals), Darius Užkuraitis (Opus 3 director; all semi-finals), Jonas Vilimas (producer; all semi-finals), Linas Rimša (composer; first semi-final), Neda Malunavičiūtė (singer; first semi-final), Saulius Urbonavičius (musician, singer-songwriter; second semi-final), Kazimieras Šiaulys (member of LATGA; second semi-final), Povilas Meškėla (singer; third semi-final) and Aistė Smilgevičiūtė (singer; third semi-final). The top four entries advanced to the final from each semi-final, while the bottom entries were eliminated. On 22 February 2010, LRT announced the three entries that had received a wildcard to also proceed to the final.

On 22 February 2010, "Running Fast" performed by Donatas Montvydas, which advanced from the second semi-final, was disqualified as the song had been publicly performed before 1 October 2009. The song "Material World" performed by Amberlife, which placed fourth in the second semi-final, replaced the song and advanced to the final.

Final
The final of the competition took place on 4 March 2010 and featured the remaining twelve entries that qualified from the semi-finals. The final was the only show in the competition to be broadcast live; all other preceding shows were pre-recorded earlier in the week before their airdates. The members of the jury consisted of Mindaugas Urbaitis (member of LATGA), Darius Užkuraitis (Opus 3 director), Jonas Vilimas (producer), Rosita Čivilytė (singer) and Artūras Novikas (conductor, composer and singer). "Eastern European Funk" performed by InCulto was selected as the winner after gaining the most points from both the jury vote and the public vote.

Promotion 
InCulto made several appearances across Europe to specifically promote "Eastern European Funk" as the Lithuanian Eurovision entry. The promotional tour was sponsored by the company ACME Baltija under the title InCulto ACME Eurovision Tour. On 6 April, InCulto began their tour in Oslo, Norway where they performed at the Hard Rock Cafe and the Queens Pub. On 14 April, InCulto performed at the Republic Square in Yerevan, Armenia, while the group took part in promotional activities in Tbilisi, Georgia between 15 and 16 April. Between 21 and 22 April, InCulto completed promotional activities in Ukraine by giving interviews to local media, making television and radio appearances, and performing at the Bochka Khmelnytska venue as well as the Khreshchatyk in Kyiv. On 24 April, InCulto performed during the Eurovision in Concert event which was held at the Lexion venue in Zaanstad, Netherlands and hosted by Cornald Maas and Marga Bult. On 1 May, InCulto performed at the Cuba Cafe in Riga, Latvia and appeared on Radio SWH. As part of the promotional tour, InCulto also visited Bulgaria, Croatia, Romania, Serbia and Slovenia between 3 and 9 May. In Croatia, the group held a concert at the Ban Jelačić Square in Zagreb and took part in the Women in High Heels Race. Between 11 and 12 May, InCulto completed promotional activities in Estonia.

In addition to their international appearances, three farewell concerts were held in Kaunas, Klaipėda and Vilnius between 13 and 15 May before InCulto travelled to Oslo for the contest on 17 May.

At Eurovision

According to Eurovision rules, all nations with the exceptions of the host country and the "Big Four" (France, Germany, Spain and the United Kingdom) were required to qualify from one of two semi-finals in order to compete for the final; the top ten countries from each semi-final progress to the final. The European Broadcasting Union (EBU) split up the competing countries into six different pots based on voting patterns from previous contests, with countries with favourable voting histories put into the same pot. On 7 February 2010, a special allocation draw was held which placed each country into one of the two semi-finals, as well as which half of the show they would perform in. Lithuania was placed into the second semi-final, to be held on 27 May 2010, and was scheduled to perform in the first half of the show. The running order for the semi-finals was decided through another draw on 23 March 2010 and Lithuania was set to open the show and perform in position 1, before the entry from Armenia.

The two semi-finals and final were broadcast in Lithuania on LTV and LTV World with commentary by Darius Užkuraitis. The Lithuanian spokesperson, who announced the Lithuanian votes during the final, was Giedrius Masalskis.

Semi-final 

InCulto took part in technical rehearsals on 18 and 21 May, followed by dress rehearsals on 26 and 27 May. This included the jury show on 26 May where the professional juries of each country watched and voted on the competing entries.

The Lithuanian performance featured the members of InCulto performing synchronised dance moves on stage dressed in white shirts with black ties and brown tartan patterned trousers. The performance also featured the members of InCulto mimic playing inflatable musical instruments in different colours and throwing off their trousers prior to the last refrain to reveal glittery silver boxer shorts. The stage colours transitioned from blue, red, white and yellow to pink and white.

At the end of the show, Lithuania was not announced among the top 10 entries in the second semi-final and therefore failed to qualify to compete in the final. It was later revealed that Lithuania placed twelfth in the semi-final, receiving a total of 44 points.

Voting 
Voting during the three shows consisted of 50 percent public televoting and 50 percent from a jury deliberation. The jury consisted of five music industry professionals who were citizens of the country they represent. This jury was asked to judge each contestant based on: vocal capacity; the stage performance; the song's composition and originality; and the overall impression by the act. In addition, no member of a national jury could be related in any way to any of the competing acts in such a way that they cannot vote impartially and independently.

Following the release of the full split voting by the EBU after the conclusion of the competition, it was revealed that the Lithuania had placed eighth with the public televote and thirteenth with the jury vote in the second semi-final. In the public vote, Lithuania scored 65 points, while with the jury vote, Lithuania scored 27 points.

Below is a breakdown of points awarded to Lithuania and awarded by Lithuania in the second semi-final and grand final of the contest. The nation awarded its 12 points to Georgia in the semi-final and the final of the contest.

Points awarded to Lithuania

Points awarded by Lithuania

References

External links
 LRT Eurovision site

2010
Countries in the Eurovision Song Contest 2010
Eurovision